The 1938-1939 German Expedition to Tibet, a German scientific expedition, took place between April 1938 and August 1939 under the leadership of the German zoologist and SS-officer Ernst Schäfer.

Origins 
Nazi Reichsführer-SS Heinrich Himmler wished to use the reputation of the scientist and explorer Ernst Schäfer for Nazi propaganda after Schäfer's first two trips to China and Tibet in 1930 to 1931 and 1934 to 1936 came to Himmler's attention. Himmler asked about Schäfer's future plans. Schäfer responded that he wanted to lead another expedition to Tibet and requested for his expedition to be under the patronage of the cultural department of the Foreign Affairs Department or of the Deutsche Forschungsgemeinschaft ("German Research Foundation"). Himmler was fascinated by Asian mysticism and therefore wished to send such an expedition under the auspices of the SS Ahnenerbe (SS Ancestral Heritage Society), and he desired for Schäfer to perform research based on Hanns Hörbiger's pseudoscientific theory of "Glacial Cosmogony," promoted by the Ahnenerbe. Schäfer had scientific objectives and therefore refused to include Edmund Kiss, an adept of the theory, in his team and required 12 conditions to ensure scientific freedom. Wolfram Sievers, from the Ahnenerbe, therefore expressed criticism concerning the objectives of the expedition, and Ahnenerbe would not sponsor it. Himmler was agreeable to the expedition going ahead if all members joined the SS, and Schäfer found that he had no alternative but to accept that condition even without sponsorship.

Designations 
While he prepared the expedition, Schäfer used the term "Schaefer Expedition 1938/1939" on his letterhead and to apply for sponsorship from businessmen. The official expedition name had to be changed by order of the Ahnenerbe, however, to German Tibet-Expedition Ernst Schaefer (in capital letters), "under the patronage of the Reichsführer-SS Himmler and in connection with the Ahnenerbe" (in small letters).

After the German Consul-General in Calcutta had criticized the letterhead in a report to the German Foreign Office by "arguing that the prescribed letterhead was counter-productive and immediately generated mistrust among the British," Schäfer "ordered a new, discreet letterhead in Antiqua font, which read 'Deutsche Tibet Expedition Ernst Schäfer'." During the expedition, Schäfer used only the latter letterhead or his original "Schaefer Expedition" paper. The Ahnenerbe-prescribed letterhead was used only prior to the expedition's departure.

The British writer Christopher Hale claims that one cannot infer that Schäfer was independent of the SS and could do "pure science" simply from the special letterhead that he got printed for the expedition. To all intents and purposes, the expedition remained under Himmler's patronage, and Schäfer had no interest in losing his support.

In its time, the expedition was also commonly referred to in German newspapers and academic journals as the "SS Tibet Expedition," as it had Himmler as its patron, and all five members were SS officers. The "SS Tibet Expedition" designation was used by Schäfer himself in the Atlantis Journal. "SS Tibet Expedition" is the title used in a 1946 report by US military intelligence in Western Europe.

In the "Register of the Heinrich Himmler Papers," 1914–1944, archived at Stanford University's Hoover institution, the folder containing the material pertaining to the expedition bears the title "The SS-Tibet-Expedition, 1939.

That designation is still in use by modern scholars, such as Mechtild Rössler in 2001, and Suzanne Heim in 2002, as well as by the writer Peter Lavenda in 2002.

 Funding 
According to Christopher Hale, as Schäfer was demanding more than 60,000 Reichsmarks for his expedition, and the coffers of the SS were depleted at the time, he was forced to raise the funds himself.

According to researcher Isrun Engelhardt, the expedition was not funded by the Ahnenerbe. Schäfer raised the funds by himself, 80% of which came from the Public Relations and Advertising Council of German Industry (Werberat der deutschen Wirtschaft) as well as large German business enterprises, Deutsche Forschungsgemeinschaft (German Research Foundation) and Brooke Dolan II. Himmler's personal friends sponsored only the flight back to Germany.

According to the United States, the expedition's funding was provided by various public and private contributors, with the return flight to Germany being paid for by the SS. The cost of equipping the expedition was RM 65,000, and the expedition itself cost another RM 65,000, excluding the flight back.

 Members 

Ernst Schäfer was a member of the SS when he arrived at the German consulate in Chungking in 1935. He had just returned from a trip through parts of Asia, mainly India and China, in which the two other heads of the expedition had abandoned him out of fear of the native tribes. Schäfer turned the expedition from a complete failure into a great success, and the SS took note by sending him a letter informing him of a promotion to SS-Untersturmführer and summoning him back to Germany from Philadelphia, Pennsylvania. In June 1936, Schäfer met with Himmler, who informed Sievers and Galke to start organizing an expedition to Tibet.

Schäfer recruited young, fit men who would be well suited for an arduous journey. At 24, Karl Wienert (an assistant of Wilhelm Filchner, a famous explorer) was the team's geologist. Also 24, Edmund Geer was selected as the technical leader to organize the expedition. A relatively-old teammate, who was 38, was Ernst Krause (not to be confused with the German biologist of the same name), who was to double as a filmmaker and an entomologist. Bruno Beger was a 26-year-old Rassekunde expert and student of Hans F.K. Günther and was to be the team's anthropologist.

 Objectives 

The researcher Roger Croston described the objective of the expedition as "an holistic creation of a complete biological record of Tibet alongside a synthesis of inter-relating natural sciences with regard to geography, cartography, geology, earth magnetics, climate, plants, animals and mankind."Ernst Schäfer, Geheimnis Tibet. München: Bruckmann 1943, 7-16, see also Engelhardt, Isrun, Nazis of Tibet: A Twentieth Century Myth. In: Monica Esposito (ed.), Images of Tibet in the 19th and 20th Centuries. Paris: École française d'Extrême-Orient (EFEO), coll. Études thématiques 22, vol. I, 2008, p.76.

Reacting to Dr Isrun Engelhardt's conclusions that the Schäfer expedition was "purely scientific" and her claim that the historical context of Germany in the 1930s made the expedition's goals appear as somehow sinister, the British writer Christopher Hale observed that "while the idea of ‘Nazi botany’ or ‘Nazi ornithology’ is probably absurd, other sciences are not so innocent – and Schäfer's small expedition represented a cross-section of German science in the 1930s." To Hale, that has considerable significance as "under the Third Reich anthropology and medicine were cold-bloodedly exploited to support and enact a murderous creed." There have been allegations that one of the expedition's purposes was to determine whether Tibet was the cradle of the "Aryan race". The taking of cranial measurements and the making of facial casts of local people by the anthropologist Bruno Beger did little to dissipate those allegations.

Hale also recalled the existence of a secret warning issued by propaganda minister Joseph Goebbels to German newspapers in 1940 that "the chief task of the Tibet expedition" was "of a political and military nature" and "had not so much to do with the solution of scientific questions" and added that details could not be revealed.

However, Croston agreed with Engelhardt and stated that the expedition "was planned as a scientific mission […] but it was caught up in the politics of the time.[…] Schaefer’s vehement refusal to accept Himmler’s plans led, eventually, to the expedition not being sponsored by Himmler’s SS or its organisations 'because it would lie outside the scope of his work'."

The Chinese journalist Ren Yanshi, quoting the Austrian weekly Wochenpresse, wrote that the first major task of the expedition was "to investigate the possibility of establishing the region as a base for attacking the British troops stationed in India," and its second major assignment was "to verify Heinrich Himmler's Nazi racial theory that a group of pure-blooded Aryans had settled in Tibet."

According to the American journalist Karl E. Meyer, one of the expedition's aims was to prepare maps and survey passes "for possible use of Tibet as a staging ground for guerrilla assaults on British India."

The Italian essayist Claudio Mutti stated that the official plan included research on the landforms, climate, geography, and culture of the region, and contacting the local authorities for the establishment of representation in the country.

According to Claudio Mutti, the group of five researchers intended to contact the Regent of Tibet and to visit the sacred cities of Lhasa and Shigatse. Even with wartime difficulties, the group contacted the Tibetan authorities and people. They returned to Germany with a complete edition of the Tibetan sacred text the Kangyur (108 volumes), examples of Mandala, other ancient texts, and an alleged document regarding the "Aryan race". The documents were kept in the Ahnenerbe archives.

 Details 

In July 1937, the team suffered a setback when Japan invaded Manchuria, China, which ruined Schäfer's plans to use the Yangtze River to reach Tibet. Schäfer flew to London to seek permission to travel through India but was turned down by the British government, which feared an imminent war with Germany.

Another problem in the preparations for the Tibetan expedition occurred during a duck hunting accident on November 9, 1937, when Schäfer, his wife of four months and two servants were in a rowboat. A sudden wave caused Schäfer to drop his gun which broke in two and discharged, which mortally wounded his wife. Despite subsequent emotional problems, Schäfer was back to work on the expedition in eight weeks.

In a move that lost the Ahnenerbe's support, Schäfer asked Himmler for permission simply to arrive in India and to try to force his way into Tibet. Himmler agreed with the plan and set about furthering it by contacting influential people, including German Foreign Minister Joachim von Ribbentrop. On April 21, 1938, the team departed from Genoa, Italy, on their way to Ceylon, where they would then travel to Calcutta, British India.

The day before the team had left Europe, the Völkischer Beobachter ran an article on the expedition, which alerted British officials of its intentions. Schäfer and Himmler were enraged. Schäfer complained to SS headquarters and Himmler in turn wrote to Admiral Barry Domvile, who was a Nazi supporter and former head of British naval intelligence. He sent the letter to British Prime Minister Neville Chamberlain, who permitted the SS team to enter Sikkim, a region bordering Tibet.

 Journey through Sikkim 
In Sikkim's capital of Gangtok, the team assembled a 50-mule caravan and searched for porters and Tibetan interpreters. There, the British official, Sir Basil Gould, observed them and described Schäfer as "interesting, forceful, volatile, scholarly, vain to the point of childishness, disregardful of social convention." Gould noted that Schäfer was determined to enter Tibet regardless of permission.

The team began its journey on June 21, 1938, traveled through the Teesta River valley, and then headed north. Krause worked light traps to capture insects, Wienert toured the hills to make measurements, Geer collected bird species and Beger offered locals medical help in exchange for allowing him to take measurements of them.

In August 1938, a high official of the Rajah Tering, a member of the Sikkimese royal family living in Tibet, entered the team's camp. Although Beger wished to ask the guest's permission to measure him, he was dissuaded by the Tibetan porters, who encouraged him to wait for Schäfer to return from a hunting trip. Schäfer met with the official and presented him with mule-loads of gifts.

In December 1938, the Tibetan council of ministers invited Schäfer and his team to Tibet but forbade them from killing any animals during their stay by citing religious concerns. After a supply trip back to Gangtok, Schäfer learned he had been promoted to SS-Hauptsturmführer, and the rest of the team had been promoted to SS-Obersturmführer.

 Trip To Lhasa 

During the trip to Tibet's highlands, Beger began making facial casts of local people, including his personal servant, a Nepalese Sherpa named Passang. During the first casting, paste got into one of Passang's nostrils and he panicked, which tore at the mask. Schäfer threatened to terminate the employment of the porters who had seen the incident if they told anyone. Most of the Tibetans had a much more friendly and light-hearted attitude, however, and photographic and film footage remains of smiling and laughing Tibetans undergoing facial and skull feature measurements.

On January 19, 1939, the team reached Lhasa, the capital of Tibet. Schäfer proceeded to pay his respects to the Tibetan ministers and a nobleman. He also gave out Nazi pennants and explained the reverence shown for the shared symbol in Germany. His permission to remain in Lhasa was extended, and he was permitted to photograph and film the region. The team spent two months in Lhasa and collected information on agriculture, culture, and religion.

As the arrival of the expedition had been announced in advance, its members, according to Bruno Beger's testimony, were welcome everywhere in Tibet and provided with all the things that they needed for their trip and sojourn. In Lhasa itself, they got into close touch with government officials and other noteworthy people.

Schäfer met the Regent of Tibet, Reting Rinpoche, on several occasions. During one of their meetings, the Regent asked him point blank whether his country would be willing to sell weapons to Tibet.

 Trip to Gyantse and Shigatse 
In March 1939, the expedition left Lhasa, headed for Gyantse, and was escorted by a Tibetan official. After exploring the ruins of the ancient deserted capital city of Jalung Phodrang, they reached Shigatse, the city of the panchen lamas, in April. They received a warm welcome from the locals, with thousands coming out to greet them.Christopher Hale, Himmler's Crusade. The Nazi Expedition to Find the Origins of the Aryan Race, John Wiley & Sons, Hoboken (NJ), 2003, 422 p.: "When the German Tibet Expedition arrived in Shigatse, thousands came out to greet them." In a 1946 "Final Interrogation Report by American Intelligence", Schäfer claims to have met "the pro-German regent of Shigatse"Alex McKay, The History of Tibet: 1895-1959, the encounter with modernity, RoutledgeCurzon, 2003, 737 p., p. 32: "As with the Dalai Lama, Regents were appointed at Shigatse during the periods between ruling Panchen Lamas." (the 9th Panchen Lama had died in 1937 and the 10th was not to arrive before 1951). In May, the expedition returned to Gyantse, where negotiations were held with local British officials about the trip back to India and the transport of the expeditions's gear and collections.

 Communications with Germany 
Throughout his stay in Lhasa, Ernst Schäfer remained in touch with Germany through mail and the Chinese Legation's radio. Himmler is reported to have followed the expedition enthusiastically, written several letters to Schäfer and even broadcast Christmas greetings to him via shortwave.

 Results of research 

The Germans collected anything they could: thousands of artifacts, a huge number of plants and animals, including live specimens. They sent back specimens of three breeds of Tibetan dogs, rare feline species, wolves, badgers, foxes, other animals, and bird skins.

The expedition members collected a huge quantity of plants, particularly hundreds of varieties of barley, wheat, and oats. The seeds were later stored in the SS-Institute for Plant Genetics in Lannach, near Graz, Austria, a research centre run by SS botanist Heinz Brücher, who entertained hopes of using both the Tibet collection and that of the Vavilov Institute in the eastern territories to select crop plants able to withstand the climate of Eastern Europe, which was considered as part of the Nazi Lebensraum or "living space," with a view to reaching autarky.

Wienert took four sets of geomagnetic data. Krause studied Tibetan wasps. Schäfer observed Tibetan rituals, including sky burial, and even bought some human skulls. The researchers took stills and film footage of local culture, notably the spectacular New Year celebrations in which tens of thousands of pilgrims flocked to Lhasa. Bruno Beger recorded the measurements of 376 people and took casts of the heads, faces, hands, and ears of 17 others, as well as fingerprints and handprints from another 350. To carry out his research, he posed as a physician to win the favour of Tibetan aristocrats, dispensed drugs, and tended to monks with sexually-transmitted diseases.

Schäfer kept meticulous notes on the religious and cultural customs of the Tibetans from their various colorful Buddhist festivals to Tibetan attitudes towards marriage, rape, menstruation, childbirth, homosexuality, and masturbation. In his account of Tibetan homosexuality, he described the various positions taken by older lamas with younger boys and then went on to explain how homosexuality played an important role in the higher politics of Tibet. There are pages of careful observation of Himalayan people engaged in a variety of intimate acts.

Schäfer presented the results of the expedition on 25 July 1939 at the Himalaya Club Calcutta.

 Return home 
After Schäfer had read a letter from his father who reported to him about the imminent threat of war and urged him to return to Germany as quickly as possible, Schäfer decided to return to Germany. After being given two complimentary letters, one to Hitler and the other to Himmler, Schäfer and his companions left Lhasa in August 1939. They also took with them two presents for Hitler that consisted of a Lhama dress and a hunting dog, as well as a copy of the Tibetan "Bible", the 120-volume Kangyur. They headed south to Calcutta, boarded a seaplane at the mouth of the Hooghly River, and began the journey home.

According to Engelhardt:

According to Trimondis at Tempelhof Airport in Berlin, they were greeted on the runway by an ecstatic Himmler, who presented Schäfer with the SS skull ring and dagger of honor.

When grilled by US military intelligence in February 1946, Schäfer stated that after his return, he had a meeting with Himmler in which he outlined his plans to launch another expedition to Tibet in case of war. The idea was to win Tibet over to the German side and to organize a resistance movement there. The project never took off.

After returning to Germany, Wienert, Krause and Geer went back to civilian life and were heard of no more. Beger worked together with August Hirt at the Reichsuniversität Straßburg. His assignment, which he carried out, was to provide the Nazi physician with a selection of detainees of diverse ethnic types from Auschwitz to serve Hirt's racial experiments.John J. Reilly (2003): "The SS wanted racial classifications of its prisoners, so Beger was sent to Auschwitz to select interesting subjects (...). He made the familiar measurements of the living subjects. Soon after the measurements were taken, these people were gassed and pickled. The idea was to reduce them to skeletons for a large collection that could be systematically compared with the measurements taken from living bodies."

In 1943, Schäfer was given his own institute within the Ahnenerbe. He named it "the Sven Hedin Institute for Inner Asian Research" after the Swedish explorer who visited Tibet in 1907.

In 1943, the release of the film Geheimnis Tibet put together from the various rolls brought back from Tibet. It premiered on January 16, during the inauguration of the Sven Hedin Institute, with the Swedish explorer himself in attendance.

Because of the war, Schäfer's writings about the trip were not published until 1950, under the title "Festival of the White Gauze Scarves: A research expedition through Tibet to Lhasa, the holy city of the god realm."

All through the expedition, Beger kept a travel diary, which was published in book form 60 years later: Mit der deutschen Tibetexpedition Ernst Schäfer 1938/39 nach Lhasa (Wiesbaden, 1998). Only 50 copies of it exist.

 See also 

 1939 Japanese expedition to Tibet
 Seven Years in Tibet German Antarctic Expedition (1938–1939)
German Amazon-Jary-Expedition (1935-1937)

 Footnotes 

References
 
 
 
 
 The Activities of Dr. Ernst Schaefer, United States Forces - European Theater, Military Intelligence Service Center, APO 757 Final Interrogation Report (OI-FIR) No. 32, Feb. 12, 1946.
 Michael H. Kater, Das "Ahnenerbe" der SS 1935-1945; ein Beitrag zur Kulturpolitik des Dritten Reiches, Stuttgart, Deutsche Verlags-Anstalt, 1974 (paperback edition 2001, Oldenbourg Verlag, 2001)
  Detlev Rose, L'expédition allemande au Tibet de 1938-39. Voyage scientifique ou quête de traces à motivation idéologique ?, in Synergies européennes - Bruxelles-Munich-Tübingen, novembre 2006 (article originating from Deutschland in Geschichte und Gegenwart, No 3-2006)."
 Peter Mierau, Nationalsozialistische Expeditionspolitik. Deutsche Asien-Expeditionen 1933–1945'', Múnich, 2006 (contains an account of Schäfer's expeditions).
 Isrun Engelhardt, «Tibetan Triangle. German, Tibetan and British relations in the context of E. Schäfer's expedition, 1938-1939», in Asiatische Studien, LVIII.1, 2004.
 Isrun Engelhardt, «Tibet in 1938-1939 : Photographs from the Ernst Schäfer Expedition to Tibet», Serindia, Chicago, 2007. Online: «Tibet in 1938–1939: The Ernst Schäfer Expedition to Tibet», pp. 11–61.
 Isrun Engelhardt, «Mishandled Mail : The Strange Case of the Reting Regent's Letters to Hitler», in Proceedings of the Tenth Seminar of the International Association for Tibetan Studies 2003, Oxford.
 Isrun Engelhardt, «The Nazis of Tibet : A twentieth century myth», in Monica Esposito, Images of Tibet in the 19th and 20th Centuries, Ecole française d'Extrême Orient, coll. «Etudes thématiques», 2008.
 Wolfgang Kaufmann, "Das Dritte Reich und Tibet. Die Heimat des 'östlichen Hakenkreuzes' im Blickfeld der Nationalsozialisten", Ludwigsfelder Verlagshaus 2009 (962 p.).

Occultism in Nazism
Nazi SS
Research and development in Nazi Germany
History of Tibet
Expeditions from Germany
1930s in Tibet
1938 in Tibet
1939 in Tibet
Germany–Tibet relations
Asian expeditions